Trail Blazers is a 1953 drama film directed by Wesley Barry and starring Alan Hale Jr., Richard Tyler and Lyle Talbot. It was produced as a second feature and released by Allied Artists.

Synopsis
Concerned about the level of juvenile delinquency in his California town, a man establishes a youth club for boys. While taking them on an expedition to the mountains they encounter two dangerous escaped convicts.

Cast
 Alan Hale Jr. as Roger Stone
 Richard Tyler as 	Ben
 Barney McCormack as 	Feathers
 Jim Flowers as 	Pudge
 Henry Blair as 	Spike
 Robert Hyatt as 	Jim 
 Danny Welton as 	Mike
 Mickey Colpack as 	Andy
 Duke York as Angus
 Lyle Talbot as Deputy Sheriff McLain
 Rick Vallin as	Officer Lundig

References

Bibliography
 Martin, Len D. The Allied Artists Checklist: The Feature Films and Short Subjects of Allied Artists Pictures Corporation, 1947-1978. McFarland & Company, 1993.

External links
 

1953 films
1953 drama films
American drama films
American black-and-white films
Allied Artists films
Films directed by Wesley Barry
1950s English-language films
1950s American films